Aage Berntsen (16 May 1885 – 16 April 1952) was a Danish fencer, poet, doctor and artist. He competed in five events at the 1920 Summer Olympics.

He was son of the Danish prime minister Klaus Berntsen and his brother was the fencer Oluf Berntsen.

Among his poetry and writings he is best known for the text for Fynsk Foraar with music by Carl Nielsen.

References

External links
 

1885 births
1952 deaths
Danish male fencers
Olympic fencers of Denmark
Danish male poets
Fencers at the 1920 Summer Olympics
20th-century Danish poets
20th-century Danish male writers
People from Nordfyn Municipality